Uncial 051 (in the Gregory-Aland numbering), is a Greek uncial manuscript of the Book of Revelation, dated paleographically to the 10th century.

Description 

The codex contains incomplete text of Rev 1:1-11:14, 13:2-3, 22:8-14, with a commentary of Andreas's (see Uncial 052), on 92 parchment leaves (23 cm by 18 cm). The text is written in one column per page, 22 lines per page (16.6 by 10.5 cm), in uncial letters. The uncial letters leaned to the right. A commentary is written in cursive letters. It has breathings and accents.

The Greek text of this codex Aland placed in Category III.

In Revelation 11:17 it has traditional reading και ο ερχομενος along with manuscripts 35, 1006, 1841, 2074, 2723, the Bohairic, Tyconius, and Vulgata Clementina (qui venturus es).

The manuscript was written in Italy. In 1899 Kirsopp Lake photographed 1 page of it. In 1902 it was thoroughly examined by C. R. Gregory, who partially collated its text. Herman C. Hoskier collated and edited its text in 1929.

The codex is located in the Pantokratoros monastery of Mount Athos (44).

See also 

 List of New Testament uncials
 Textual criticism

References

Further reading 

 C. R. Gregory, Textkritik des Neuen Testamentes III (Leipzig 1909), pp. 1042–1046.
 Herman C. Hoskier, Concerning The Text of The Apocalypse (London 1929), pp. 2–4.

External links 
 

Greek New Testament uncials
10th-century biblical manuscripts
Athos manuscripts
Pantokratoros Monastery